The Australian cricket team toured South Africa from 4 to 9 March 2016 to play three Twenty20 International matches. The matches were in preparation for the 2016 ICC World Twenty20 which started later that month in India. Australia won the series 2–1.

Squads

T20I series

1st T20I

2nd T20I

3rd T20I

References

External links
 Series home at ESPN Cricinfo

2016 in Australian cricket
2016 in South African cricket
International cricket competitions in 2015–16
Australian cricket tours of South Africa